The Mamin Cabinet was the 11th composition of the Government of Kazakhstan under the leadership of Prime Minister Askar Mamin. It was formed after the previous government, led by Prime Minister Bakytzhan Sagintayev, was dismissed by President Nursultan Nazarbayev on 21 February 2019 as a result of the discontent in the 2019–20 Kazakh protests. Mamin, under Sagintayev, served as the First Deputy Prime Minister and was appointed as the Acting PM. He was officially confirmed by the Parliament on 25 February 2019, which formed a new cabinet. The government resigned after the 2022 Kazakhstan unrest.

Composition

References

Cabinets of Kazakhstan
2019 in Kazakhstan
Cabinets established in 2019
2019 establishments in Kazakhstan
2022 disestablishments in Asia
Cabinets disestablished in 2022